Loktionov is a Russian masculine surname, its feminine counterpart is Loktionova. It may refer to

Andrei Loktionov (born 1990), Russian professional ice hockey player 
Aleksandr Loktionov (1893–1941), Soviet military officer
Roman Loktionov (disambiguation), several people

Russian-language surnames